Bilal Danguir (born 2 January 1986) is a Moroccan footballer who currently plays for Al-Baqa'a.

Club career 
In August 2018, he moved to Jordanian side Al-Baqa'a. The transfer fee was undisclosed.

References

External links 
https://www.footballdatabase.eu/en/player/details/119071-bilal-danguir
http://www.kooora.com/?player=24586&mode=

Moroccan footballers
Expatriate footballers in Jordan
Al-Baqa'a Club players
Association football forwards
1986 births
Living people
Wydad de Fès players
Ittihad Tanger players
Raja CA players
Chabab Rif Al Hoceima players
Al-Taawon (UAE) Club players
Fanja SC players
Union Sidi Kacem players